Adaina bolivari is a species of moth in the family Pterophoridae. It is found in Venezuela and Ecuador.

References

Moths described in 1987
Pterophoridae of South America